The SS Keystorm was a steel freighter that sank in 1912 after hitting Scotch Island shoal. The sinking was considered the most significant accident in the area for the previous 50 years.

After the sinking, the captain and first mate were found guilty of negligence.

The wreck was sold in 1917 and her cargo salvaged in 1919.

References

Shipwrecks of the Saint Lawrence River
Maritime incidents in 1912
1910 ships